Io ti amo is a 1968 Italian "musicarello" romantic thriller film directed by  Antonio Margheriti and starring 
Dalida, Alberto Lupo, and Marisa Quattrini.

References

External links

1968 films
1960s Italian-language films
1968 romantic comedy films
Films directed by Antonio Margheriti
Italian romantic comedy films
1960s Italian films
Musicarelli